MGZ may mean:

Mbugwe language
Metal Gear Solid: Ground Zeroes
Militärgeschichtliche Zeitschrift